Gravity-gradient stabilization or tidal stabilization is a passive method of stabilizing artificial satellites or space tethers in a fixed orientation using only the mass distribution of the orbited body and the gravitational field.  The main advantage over using active stabilization with propellants, gyroscopes or reaction wheels is the low use of power and resources. It can also reduce or prevent the risk of propellant contamination of sensitive components.

The technique exploits the Earth's gravitational field and tidal forces to keep the spacecraft aligned along the desired orientation. The gravity of the Earth decreases according to the inverse-square law, and by extending the long axis perpendicular to the orbit, the "lower" part of the orbiting structure will be more attracted to the Earth.  The effect is that the satellite will tend to align its axis of minimum moment of inertia vertically.

The first attempt to use this technique in human spaceflight occurred on September 13, 1966 during the US Gemini 11 mission. The Gemini spacecraft was attached to the Agena target vehicle by a  tether. The attempt was a failure, as insufficient gradient was produced to keep the tether taut.

The Department of Defense Gravity Experiment (DODGE) satellite was the first successful use of the method in a near-geosynchronous orbit on the satellite in July 1967.

Gravity-gradient stabilization was first used in low Earth orbit and was tested unsuccessfully for geosynchronous orbit in the Applications Technology Satellites ATS-2, ATS-4 and ATS-5 from 1966 until 1969.

The lunar orbiter Explorer 49 launched in 1973 was gravity gradient oriented (Z axis parallel to local vertical).

The Long Duration Exposure Facility (LDEF) aboard the ISS used this method for 3-axis stabilization; yaw about the vertical axis was stabilized.

Gravity-gradient stabilization was attempted during NASA's TSS-1 mission in July 1992, but the project failed due to tether deployment problems. In 1996, another mission, TSS-1R, was attempted but failed when the tether broke. Just prior to tether separation, the tension in the tether was about 65 N (14.6 lbs).

See also
Gravity gradiometry, the study of gravitational variations
Space tether, a cable connecting multiple bodies in space
Tidal locking, another effect of tidal forces
Magnetorquers, another passive stabilization technique

External links
NASA on ATS-2
Gunter's Space Page on ATS 2, 4 and 5
A new kind of Earth Sensor using a proof mass on a MEMS created by EPFL students

References 

Spacecraft attitude control
Spacecraft propulsion
Spacecraft components
Tidal forces